Daniel L. Byman is a professor at Georgetown University's Walsh School of Foreign Service. He is a senior fellow at the Center for Middle East Policy at the Brookings Institution where he conducts research on terrorism, Iran, and other Middle East security issues. Byman previously served as the vice dean of the School of Foreign Service's undergraduate program, the director of the Center for Security Studies and Security Studies Program at Georgetown University and as research director of the Center for Middle East Public Policy at the RAND Corporation. He is also the lead course instructor for Georgetown's massive open online course on Terrorism and Counter Terrorism.  
 
Byman was a professional staff member on both the 9/11 commission and the Joint 9/11 Inquiry Staff of the House and Senate Intelligence Committees. Early in his career, he served as a political analyst for the U.S. government. He holds a BA from Amherst College and a PhD from Massachusetts Institute of Technology. His latest book is Al Qaeda, the Islamic State, and the Global Jihadist Movement: What Everyone Needs to Know was published by Oxford University Press in 2015.

Publications 
Byman's publications include the books A High Price:The Triumphs and Failures of Israeli Counterterrorism, The Five Front War: A Better Way to Fight Global Jihad, Things Fall Apart: Containing the Spillover From an Iraqi Civil War, Keeping the Peace: Lasting Solutions to Ethnic Conflicts, and Deadly Connections: States That Sponsor Terrorism. Byman has written extensively on a range of topics related to terrorism, international security, civil and ethnic conflict, and the Middle East.  He is a frequent contributor to Foreign Affairs, Foreign Policy and The Washington Post, and his work has appeared in a range of scholarly and policy journals.

Selected bibliography 
 
 
 
 
 
 
 "The Wobbling Red Line in Syria", op-ed, New York Times. May 4, 2013. "Empty threats weaken America's credibility", regarding President Obama's "red line" comment on Syria's chemical weapons.

Notes

External links 
 

Living people
American male writers
Brookings Institution people
Terrorism theorists
American political scientists
International security
Peace and conflict scholars
Writers on the Middle East
Experts on terrorism
Walsh School of Foreign Service faculty
Amherst College alumni
Massachusetts Institute of Technology alumni
Year of birth missing (living people)